The Best People is a 1925 American silent comedy film produced by Famous Players-Lasky and distributed by Paramount. It was directed by Sidney Olcott with Warner Baxter in the leading role.<ref>[http://www.afi.com/members/catalog/DetailView.aspx?s=&Movie=2816 The AFI Catalog of Feature Films: The Best People]</ref>

The film was remade in 1930 as Fast and Loose starring Miriam Hopkins.

Plot
As described in a review in a film magazine, Mrs. Lenox (Williams) is marrying her daughter Miriam (Morris) to the scion of another "best family," but the girl prefers their chauffeur, who has red blood instead of blue. Bertie Lenox (Striker) has fallen in love with an impossible chorus girl who will not marry him until he gives up his money and goes to work. Arthur Rockmere (Austin), the fiancé, has arranged a supper with Alice O'Neill (Ralston), the chorus girl, and her chum, Millie Montgomery (Livingston), also of the chorus, with the idea of buying Alice off. Bertie resents this private-room affair. There is a sidewalk fight outside the supper club that lands most of them in the police station, where Millie bails them out with the money Bertie's father has given her to enlist her aid in breaking off the distasteful match, and they all roll home in a taxi the next morning. The children get their hearts' delights, and Millie lands Bertie's Uncle Throckmorton (Steers), a self-constituted social arbiter, who richly deserves his fate — and seems to enjoy it.

Cast

Preservation
With no prints of The Best People'' located in any film archives, it is a lost film

References

External links

 The Best People website dedicated to Sidney Olcott

1925 films
American silent feature films
Films directed by Sidney Olcott
American black-and-white films
1925 romantic comedy films
American romantic comedy films
Lost American films
1925 lost films
Lost comedy films
1920s American films
Silent romantic comedy films
Silent American comedy films